Kevin Barry Morgan (22 May 1921 – 6 September 2003) was an Australian politician and a member of the New South Wales Legislative Assembly  for a single term between 1953 and 1956. He was a member of the Labor Party (ALP).

Morgan was born in  Wollongong, New South Wales and was the son of federal MP Charles Morgan.  He was educated at Saint Ignatius' College, Riverview and the Law School of the University of Sydney, from where he graduated in 1949. He worked as a solicitor in a practice established by his father. During World War Two he served with the Second Australian Imperial Force in New Guinea between 1941 and 1944 and reached the rank of sergeant. Morgan was elected to parliament as the Labor member for Parramatta at the 1953 state election. The incumbent Liberal member George Gollan had retired. The 1953 election saw Labor make significant gains in marginal seats, particularly in the Western Suburbs of Sydney. At the next election, in 1956, Labor's vote dropped because of divisions within the federal Labor Party and the formation of the DLP. As a result, Morgan lost the seat to the Liberal party's Jim Clough and retired from public life. He did not hold party, parliamentary or ministerial office. After leaving parliament, Morgan continued in his law practice. He wrote a family history called Ancestors and anecdotes and produced a play on the dismissal of Jack Lang called Friday, 13th May, 1932.

References

 

1921 births
2003 deaths
Members of the New South Wales Legislative Assembly
Australian Labor Party members of the Parliament of New South Wales
20th-century Australian politicians
Australian Army personnel of World War II
Australian Army soldiers